Glolarnaca globiceps is a species of Orthopterans, sometimes known as 'leaf-folding crickets' in the tribe Gryllacridini, recorded from Vietnam and Cambodia.

The family Gryllacrididae has been subject to extensive revision in the 21st century, illustrated by G. globiceps having been included in at least four other genera, before the current placement of genus Glolarnaca in subfamily Gryllacridinae in 2019.

Subspecies and distribution
Three subspecies are currently recognised:
 G. globiceps gialai (Gorochov, 2008) - near Buon Luoi, Gia Lai Province, Vietnam
 G. globiceps globiceps (Karny, 1929) - type locality: Cambodia (unspecified)
 G. globiceps minor (Ingrisch, 2018) - Dong Nai Biosphere Reserve, Vietnam

References

External links

Gryllacrididae
Orthoptera of Indo-China